Davud Pasha or Davut Pasha or Dawud Pasha may refer to:

 Koca Davud Pasha (died 1498), Ottoman general and grand vizier
  (fl. 1499), Ottoman grand admiral (Kapudan Pasha)
 Kara Davud Pasha (died 1623), Ottoman statesman and grand vizier
 Davud Pasha (governor of Egypt) (died 1549), Ottoman governor of Egypt
 Dawud Pasha of Baghdad (died 1851), the last Mamluk ruler of Iraq

See also
 David (name)
 Pasha (title)